In finite group theory, the Schreier conjecture asserts that the outer automorphism group of every finite simple group is solvable. It was proposed by Otto Schreier in 1926, and is now known to be true as a result of the classification of finite simple groups, but no simpler proof is known.

References
.

Theorems about finite groups
Conjectures that have been proved